A.A.T.M. Multilateral High School is a secondary school situated in Shamsher Nagar, Kamalganj Upazila, Moulvibazar District, Bangladesh. It was established in 1929 as ME Madrasa by the late Haji Mohammad Ustwar. The madrasa was upgraded to a high school in 1960. It is now named after Abbas Ali Tale Mohammad, abbreviated as A.A.T.M. The late Khurshed Ahmed was the first student who passed matriculation from this school.

References

Kamalganj Upazila
Schools in Moulvibazar District